Ypthima granulosa, the granular ringlet, is a butterfly of the family Nymphalidae. It is found in Mozambique and eastern Africa, south to extreme northern South Africa.

The wingspan is 32–36 mm for males and 34–38 mm for females. Adults are on wing year-round with peak in early summer and autumn in southern Africa.

The larvae probably feed on Poaceae grasses.

References

gran
Butterflies of Africa
Lepidoptera of South Africa
Butterflies described in 1883
Taxa named by Arthur Gardiner Butler